George Bliss Agnew (1868 – June 21, 1941) was an American politician from New York.

Life
He graduated from Princeton University in 1891.

Agnew was a member of the New York State Assembly (New York Co., 27th D.) in 1903, 1904, 1905 and 1906.

He was a member of the New York State Senate (17th D.) from 1907 to 1910, sitting in the 130th, 131st, 132nd and 133rd New York State Legislatures.

In 1908, he co-sponsored, with Assemblyman Merwin K. Hart, the Hart–Agnew Law, an anti-horse-race-track-gambling bill which led to a total shutdown of horse-racing in the State of New York.

Agnew was defeated by John G. Saxe II in the November 8, 1910, election in a district that was Republican by a great majority.

References

 Official New York from Cleveland to Hughes by Charles Elliott Fitch (Hurd Publishing Co., New York and Buffalo, 1911, Vol. IV; pg. 347, 349f, 352 and 366f)
 The New York Red Book by Edgar L. Murlin (1903; pg. 105f)

External links
 The George Bliss Agnew papers at the New York Public Library

1868 births
1941 deaths
Republican Party New York (state) state senators
People from Manhattan
Republican Party members of the New York State Assembly
Princeton University alumni
Deaths from pneumonia in New York (state)
Burials at Green-Wood Cemetery